Guthriea capensis is an acaulescent perennial herb endemic to South Africa and occurring in cool and damp sites facing south or east in the mountains of the Cape Province, Lesotho and KwaZulu-Natal. Guthriea is monotypic and was named after the botanist and mathematician Francis Guthrie by his friend the botanist Harry Bolus.

This ground-hugging species with a rhizome and fleshy roots forms a compact rosette of some 20-30 broadly elliptic or cordate discolorous leaves with crenate margins, measuring about 50 x 75 mm, glossy above with deeply indented venation hiding creamy-green flowers which are close to the ground, solitary and stalked.

Its primary pollinator is a reptile, the Drakensberg crag lizard (Pseudocordylus subviridis), a rare association, the only other plant whose primary pollinator is also reptilian (Phelsuma geckos) is Trochetia blackburniana from Mauritius. The lizards are attracted by the scent of a nectar component safranal, a cyclic terpenic aldehyde.

Guthriea belongs to the family Achariaceae, a family which now includes various species previously placed in the obsolete family Flacourtiaceae; other related species include: Kiggelaria africana, Rawsonia lucida and Xylotheca kraussiana.

Description
"Acaulescent perennial herbs with a subhorizontal rhizome and fleshy roots. Leaves rosulate, simple, ovate or cordate, petiolate, discolorous, crenate. Flowers solitary, pedicelled. Male flowers: sepals 5, linear, almost as long as corolla and adnate to it for almost its whole length; corolla 5-lobed, profusely veined, tube deeply campanulate, lobes shorter than tube, reflexed; glands 5, fleshy, situated at base of corolla tube; stamens 5, filaments arising in throat of corolla, shorter than anthers, flattened, anthers didymous with broad connective, pectinate. Female flowers: sepals 4 or 5, linear, adnate to corolla for half their length; corolla 4- or 5-lobed, tube campanulate, lobes much shorter than tube, transversely oblong, erect; glands 4 or 5, fleshy, situated at base of corolla tube; ovary sessile, with 10-15 ovules on 4 or 5 parietal placentas; style broadly linear, 4- or 5-lobed. Fruit a 4- or 5-valved capsule, enclosed in persistent corolla. Seeds several, ellipsoid, arillate."

References

External links
Distribution map
Close-up of flowers
Underside of leaf and flowers

Achariaceae
Herbs
Monotypic Malpighiales genera